Maria Cecilia "Maricel" dela Cueva Laxa-Pangilinan (born February 25, 1970) is a Filipina actress. She won Best Supporting Actress awards in the 1992 FAMAS Awards and Star Awards for her role in the 1992 film Iisa Pa Lamang.

For most of her career in the 90s she has done films with Regal Films and two films with Star Cinema she ventured in Television such as Marinella in 1999-2001 and Ysabella in 2007 for its Pilot episode in 2020-2021 she resumed acting via Cignal TVs primetime drama Paano ang Pasko and Paano Ang Pangako (Second Season) in 2022 she was last seen in Mano Po Legacy: The Family Fortune which received praise (GMA-7) and Regal Entertainment co production.

Education
Laxa attended primary school at St. Theresa's College in Quezon City, De La Salle Santiago Zobel School in Muntinlupa, and Assumption Antipolo. She attended secondary school at Assumption College in Makati. She graduated with a degree of B.S. Social Sciences at the University of the Philippines Manila and earned her Master's Degree in Family Life and Child Development at the University of the Philippines Diliman. She has a doctorate degree as well.

Personal life
Laxa is married to Anthony Pangilinan (brother of Kiko Pangilinan) and the couple has five children namely Ella, Donny (also an actor), Hannah, Benjamin and Solana.

Filmography

Film
Elvis and James: The Living Legends! (Buhay Pa... Mukhang Alamat Na!) (1989)
Last 2 Minutes (1989)
Makiusap Ka sa Diyos (1991)
Dudurugin Kita ng Bala Ko (1991)
Buburahin Kita sa Mundo! (1991)
Ikaw ang Lahat sa Akin (1992)
Iisa Pa Lamang (1992)
Alyas Boy Kano (1992)
Hindi Kita Malilimutan (1993)
Bocaue Pagoda Tragedy (1995)
Run Barbi Run (1995)
Minsan Lamang Magmamahal (1997)
Magic Kingdom: Ang Alamat ng Damortis (1997)
Magkaibigan (2008)
Litsonero (2009)
My Lady Boss (2013)
Hello, Love, Goodbye (2019)

Television / Network
GMA Supershow (1990–1997 / GMA Network)
Kadenang Kristal (1995–1996 / GMA Network)
Wansapanataym: Mail In Heaven (1997 / ABS-CBN)
 Mula Sa Puso (1997–1999 / ABS-CBN)
Marinella (1999–2001 / ABS-CBN)
Mga Anghel Na Walang Langit (2005–2006 / ABS-CBN)
Ysabella (2007 / ABS-CBN)
Kokey at Ako (2010 / ABS-CBN)
Paano ang Pasko? (2020 / TV5)
Paano ang Pangako? (2021 / TV5)
Daddy's Gurl (2021 / GMA Network)
Mano Po Legacy: The Family Fortune (2022 / GMA Network)
Apoy sa Langit (2022 / GMA Network)
The Iron Heart (2022–present / Kapamilya Channel, A2Z, TV5)

Radio
Kapamilya Konek (DZMM 630) (2013)

Awards
Laxa has won one FAMAS Award, one Gawad Urian Award, and one Star Award.

References

External links
 

1970 births
Living people
Actresses from Metro Manila
Maricel
Pangilinan family
People from Pasay
University of the Philippines Diliman alumni
University of the Philippines Manila alumni
GMA Network personalities
ABS-CBN personalities
Star Circle Quest
TV5 (Philippine TV network) personalities
Filipino television actresses
Filipino television variety show hosts